Ice is an unincorporated community in Letcher County, Kentucky, United States.

When the post office was established on December 23, 1897, someone complained about the icy weather and the name Ice stuck.  Ice's post office has since been discontinued.

References

Unincorporated communities in Letcher County, Kentucky
Unincorporated communities in Kentucky
Coal towns in Kentucky